Manos Xenakis (born ) is a retired Greek male indoor volleyball and beach volleyball player. As an indoor volleyball player, he played most notably for Olympiacos for six years, with whom he won 4 Greek Championships, 3 Greek Cups and the silver medal in the 2002 CEV Champions League, As a beach volleyball player he has won a record 7 Greek Championships and has 47 FIVB Beach Volleyball World Tour participations, with his best results being the 9th place in the 2005 FIVB World Tour (Athens OPEN) and the 7th place in FIVB Satellite 2006 in Brno (both with partner Thanasis Michalopoulos). He also has 8 CEV European Tour participations, finishing first (1st) in the CEV Satellite 2010 in Geroskipou, Cyprus (with partner Giorgos Kotsilianos).

References

External links
 Manos Xenakis interview in (Greek)

1978 births
Living people
Greek men's volleyball players
Greek beach volleyball players
Olympiacos S.C. players
Sportspeople from Athens
Volleyball players from Athens